William Farquharson (9 August 1864 – 3 August 1928) was a Jamaican cricketer. He played in five first-class matches for the Jamaican cricket team from 1894 to 1897.

See also
 List of Jamaican representative cricketers

References

External links
 

1864 births
1928 deaths
Jamaican cricketers
Jamaica cricketers
People from Saint Elizabeth Parish